The Bermuda Open was originally founded as the Bermuda Open Tennis Championships in 1879 the later called the Bermuda Championships in 1914 and was staged in Hamilton, During the 1950s and 1960s it was called the Bermuda International Championships. and was staged under that name until 1974. In 1976 the tournament was known as the Bermuda Classic. From 1914 until at least 1944 its was played on outdoor hard courts. In later years it was held in Paget in Bermuda and played on outdoor clay courts.

History
The first known tennis event to be staged in Bermuda occurred in September 1876 when a Bermuda Tournament for women was held only one time, that was won by Mary G. Gray. The first edition of the Bermuda Open Tennis Championships was staged in 1879 at Hamilton, the men's doubles event was won by Pelham Von Donop and Charles Wood. By 1914 the tournament was known as the Bermuda Championships. In 1950s-1960s the denomination used was the Bermuda International or sometimes the Bermuda Invitation. The tournament was also staged at Paget the last time occurring in 1968. The original surface was hard courts until 1944 when it switched to clay courts. In 1975 the Bermuda Championships was rebranded as the Bermuda Open. In 1976 at the final edition its name was changed again to the Bermuda Classic.

Finals

Men's Singles

Men's Doubles

See also
XL Bermuda Open, a tennis tournament held between 1993 and 2008

References

 ATP Results Archive

Grand Prix tennis circuit
Tennis tournaments in Bermuda
Clay court tennis tournaments
Hard court tennis tournaments
ATP Tour
Defunct tennis tournaments in Bermuda
1976 disestablishments in Bermuda
Recurring sporting events established in 1975
Recurring sporting events disestablished in 1976
Defunct sports competitions in Bermuda